Soora Samhaaram is a 1988 Indian Tamil-language action thriller film directed by Chitra Lakshmanan and written by Vietnam Veedu Sundaram. The film stars Kamal Haasan in the role of police officer, ACP Athi Veerapandiyan. The film was later dubbed in Telugu as Police Diary and released on 16 September 1988. Both the Tamil and Telugu versions were box office hits.

Plot 

Athi Veerapandiyan and Arun are police officers. Divya is a drug addict who cannot stop her habit even though her brother Arun pleads. One day Arun locks her up, but she dies from withdrawal. Devastated, Arun decides to take revenge on Mohandas, the kingpin of the drug mafia, but Mohandas kills him in an airport restroom. Sudha's young brother happens to watch this murder but is terrified to make this public. Pandian, who is in-charge of this case, zeroes in Sudha and her brother as witnesses, but she refuses. But when Madhuri pleads for her help, she decides to help Pandian, but now Pandian is abducted by Mohandas's men and forcefully turn him into a drug addict. The climax reveals whether Pandian nabs the drug lord and complete the revenge of his friend Arun.

Cast 
Kamal Haasan as ACP Athi Veerapandiyan
Nirosha as Sudha
Nizhalgal Ravi as Arun
Pallavi as Divya
Madhuri as Arun's wife
Kitty as Mohandas
Janagaraj as Jana
Captain Raju as Chakkaravarthy (Voice Dubbed by Delhi Ganesh)
Rajyalakshmi as Chakkaravarthy's Daughter
Vennira Aadai Moorthy as Mohandas's Labour
Veeraraghavan
Thakkali Srinivasan as Dileep
Master Meenuraj as Sudha's Brother
Kuyli (Special Appearance in the song 'Vedhalam Vanthiruku')

Soundtrack 
The music was composed by Ilaiyaraaja.

Reception 
N. Krishnaswamy of The Indian Express wrote, "Soora Samharam is destined to be somewhat muffled in its explosive impact with the entertaining vein and progressively thinning". The film ran over 100 days in many centres. Sivaji Ganesan presided over the 100-day success celebration which was held on Haasan's birthday Ilaiyaraaja won the Cinema Express Award for Best Music Director. On 6 December 2021, in his YouTube channel, Touring Talkies, Chitra Lakshmanan said the Telugu-dubbed version Police Diary, which had one additional song, ran for 185 days in Andhra Pradesh.

References

External links 
 

1980s Tamil-language films
1988 action thriller films
1988 films
Fictional portrayals of the Tamil Nadu Police
Films scored by Ilaiyaraaja
Indian action thriller films
Police detective films